MV al-Marjan was a cargo vessel active in the Horn of Africa.
It was involved in relief efforts, and delivered food commodities from Dar es Salaam to Kismayu and Merca in March 2007.

Capture by Pirates
The ship was hijacked by Somali pirates while on its way to Mogadishu from Dubai, 17 October 2007. 

Fate
The vessel caught fire and burned in the port of Mogadishu, while smuggling charcoal from Somalia to Oman.

References

Maritime incidents in 2007
Piracy in Somalia
Maritime incidents in 2010
1967 ships